Gordon Hodson is a psychology professor at Brock University, where he directs the Brock Lab of Intergroup Processes. He is known for his research on political ideology and its relationship to prejudice, intelligence, and climate change denial.

References

External links
Hodson's faculty page
Hodson's profile at Social Psychology Network

Canadian psychologists
Living people
University of Western Ontario alumni
Academic staff of Brock University
Intelligence researchers
Political psychologists
Social psychologists
Year of birth missing (living people)